was President (from 1954), then International Commissioner, and Chairman of the National Board of the Boy Scouts of Japan, the younger brother of . An engineer, he had a successful career in mining, shipping and chemicals. He was also an accomplished author, published several books on Indochina, and short stories in addition to scientific publications related to his work.

He was the discoverer of Hakore hot springs.

Background
He became a Scout leader in 1916, and participated in the 2nd World Scout Jamboree in Denmark in 1924. He also participated in the organization of the 5th Nippon Jamboree in 1970 in Asagiri Plateau, Shizuoka Prefecture.

Kurushima related an anecdote about two soldiers during the Pacific War to visiting American Scouts in Japan. After a terrible battle, an American Marine was wounded in the jungle. He saw a Japanese soldier approaching with his bayonet, but he was so weak that he collapsed and lost consciousness, certain to be killed. When he awoke, he was surprised to find his wounds bandaged and a little note written in Japanese near him. The marine was rescued and transported to a field hospital, where he showed the paper to the doctor and asked him to translate. The note said that the Japanese soldier had approached the marine to kill him, but when the marine fell he did the Scout salute, and as the Japanese soldier had also been a Scout, they were brother Scouts. The Japanese soldier could not kill the marine, instead he bandaged the marine's wounds, finally wishing him good luck and goodbye.

In 1967, Kurushima was awarded the 43rd Bronze Wolf, the only distinction of the World Organization of the Scout Movement, awarded by the World Scout Committee for exceptional services to world Scouting, at the 21st World Scout Conference. In 1959 he also received the highest distinction of the Scout Association of Japan, the Golden Pheasant Award.

References

Further reading
Dr. László Nagy, 250 Million Scouts, The World Scout Foundation and Dartnell Publishers, 1985, complete list through 1981
 Scouting Round the World, John S. Wilson, first edition, Blandford Press 1959 p. 31, 249

External links
Archive copy

1888 births
1970 deaths
Recipients of the Bronze Wolf Award
World Scout Committee members
Scouting in Japan
Chief Scouts